Sydney George Hobbins (6 May 1916 – 16 March 1984) was an English professional footballer who played in the Football League for Millwall, Leyton Orient and Charlton Athletic as a goalkeeper. After retiring from football, he jointly coached and advised the Leyton Orient reserve and 'A' teams with Ledger Ritson. Hobbins founded Welling United in 1963.

References 

English Football League players
English footballers
Leyton Orient F.C. players
1916 births
1984 deaths
Association football goalkeepers
People from Plumstead
Bromley F.C. players
Charlton Athletic F.C. players
Millwall F.C. players
Fulham F.C. wartime guest players
Crystal Palace F.C. wartime guest players
West Ham United F.C. players
Clapton Orient F.C. wartime guest players
Leyton Orient F.C. non-playing staff